A tone contour, or contour tone, is a tone in a tonal language which shifts from one pitch to another over the course of the syllable or word. Tone contours are especially common in East Asia, Southeast Asia, West Africa, Nilo-Saharan languages, Khoisan languages, Oto-Manguean languages and some languages of South America.

Contours

When the pitch descends, the contour is called a falling tone; when it ascends, a rising tone; when it descends and then returns, a dipping or falling-rising tone; and when it ascends and then returns, it is called a peaking or rising-falling tone. A tone in a contour-tone language which remains at approximately an even pitch is called a level tone. Tones which are too short to exhibit much of a contour, typically because of a final plosive consonant, may be called checked, abrupt, clipped, or stopped tones.

It has been theorized that the relative timing of a contour tone is not distinctive. That is, in some accents or languages a falling tone might fall at the end and in others it might fall at the beginning, but that such differences would not be distinctive. However, in Dinka it is reported that the phonemic falling tone falls late (impressionistically high level + fall) while the falling allophone of the low tone starts early (impressionistically fall + low level).

Lexical tones more complex than dipping (falling–rising) or peaking (rising–falling) are quite rare, perhaps nonexistent, though prosody may produce such effects. The report did not determine if the final fall was lexical or merely the declination typically seen at the ends of prosodic units, so these may actually be dipping tones.

Transcription
Diacritics such as falling , rising , dipping , peaking , high falling , low falling , high rising  and low rising . Or the simpler register tones, where diacritics such as high , mid , and low  are usually sufficient for transcription. (These are also used for high, mid, and low level contour tones.)
Tone letters such as mid level , high falling , low falling , mid rising , low rising , dipping , and peaking .
Numerical substitutions for tone letters.
Different spelling for the same vowel with different tones in systems like Latinxua Sin Wenz, Gwoyeu Romatzyh, Modern Literal Taiwanese etc. Compare Gwoyeu Romatzyh with Hanyu Pinyin (in parentheses): bai (bāi), bair (bái), bae (bǎi), bay (bài).

See also
 Contour (linguistics)
 Tone letter
Tone name

Notes

Phonology
Tone (linguistics)